Zamburak, literally meaning wasp, was a specialized form of self-propelled artillery from the early modern period, featuring small swivel guns mounted on and fired from camels. Its operators was known as a zamburakchi. It was used by the gunpowder empires, especially the Iranian empires of the Safavid dynasty, Timurid Empire and Afsharid dynasty, due to the ruggedness of the Iranian Plateau, which made typical transportation of heavy cannons difficult.

The zamburak became a popular mode of warfare in the 18th century in Indian subcontinent. The Pashtuns used it in the Battle of Gulnabad, routing a numerically superior imperial Safavid army. It was also used successfully in Nader's Campaigns, when the shah and military genius Nader Shah utilized a zamburak corps in conjunction with a regular corps of conventional cannon to devastating effect in numerous battles such as at the Battle of Damghan (1729), the Battle of Yeghevārd, and the Battle of Karnal. A large number of zamburaks were also successfully employed by Ahmed Shah Durrani during his raid in north Indian plain in defeating the Maratha forces near Panipat.

Use

Zamburaks were one of the royal guard units in the Qajar Army. A Persian zamburak regiment was accompanied by musicians with huge camel-mounted drums, to further intimidate the enemy. Zamburaks were also used during the First Anglo-Afghan War and the First and Second Anglo-Sikh Wars.

By the eighteenth century, usage of Zamburak became popular in the Indian subcontinent as well. In 1761, the Durrani conqueror, Ahmed Shah Durrani (also Ahmed Shah Abdali) used around 2000 camel guns in a battle against the Marathas, which proved to be a decisive factor in routing the Maratha forces near Panipat.

A zamburak consisted of a soldier on a camel with a mounted swivel gun (a small falconet) hinged on a metal fork-rest protruding from the camel's saddle. To fire it, the camel was put on its knees. The name is derived from the Persian word for wasp zambur (زنبور), possibly in reference to the sound earlier camel-mounted crossbows made. The camel's mobility combined with the swivel gun's flexibility and heavy firepower made an intimidating military unit, although the cannon's accuracy and range were rather low. The light cannon was also not particularly useful against heavy fortifications.

The Dzungar Khanate used camel-mounted miniature cannons in battle. Gunpowder weapons like guns and cannons were used by both sides during the Dzungar–Qing Wars.

After their invention in 1861, Gatling guns were mounted on camels as well.

References

External links
Biblomania: Free Online Literature and Study Guides
Hobson-Jobson
digital.library.upenn.edu/women/sheil/persia/185.jpeg an image
Answers.com entry (citing 1913 Webster's Dictionary)
Thefreedictionary.com entry

Artillery by type
Cannon
Camel cavalry
Indo-Persian weaponry